"Whenever He Holds You" is a song written and sung by Bobby Goldsboro, which he released in 1964. The song spent 8 weeks on the Billboard Hot 100 chart, peaking at No. 39, while reaching No. 13 on Billboard's Pop-Standard Singles chart, No. 41 on the Cash Box Top 100, and No. 28 on Canada's CHUM Hit Parade.

Chart performance

References 

1964 songs
1964 singles
Bobby Goldsboro songs
United Artists Records singles
Songs written by Bobby Goldsboro